Problématique is the scrapped studio album by German singer Kim Petras. It was planned to be released sometime in summer 2022 before being shelved due to various songs leaking online. Some of the songs may be used for Petras' studio album planned for release in 2023.

Composition 

Songs include "Je T'adore" and "All She Wants" featuring Paris Hilton.

Promotion 
In August 2021, Petras released "Future Starts Now" as a lead single for her upcoming album, along with a French-themed music video. She debuted "Coconuts" and "Hit It from the Back" at the 2021 MTV Europe Music Awards, becoming the first trans artist to perform at the award show. According to People magazine's Jack Irvin, "Coconuts" was "released to viral success" in December 2021 and "Hit It from the Back" became available to pre-save at Petras' website without a release date.

In August 2022, Hilton confirmed her collaboration on "All She Wants". Sending Petras birthday wishes on social media, Hilton wrote, "Happy Birthday sis. Love you so much! So f---ing proud of you! Keep #Sliving! So excited for our new song". The end of her post included a hashtag of the song's title.

Release 
In July–August 2022, Petras addressed rumors about the album's release on social media. She suggested the project was stalled by Amigo Records (the Dr. Luke-owned imprint of Republic Records) after a fan tweeted "R.I.P. PROBLÉMATIQUE! Please leave your flowers in the comments" along with a photoshopped image of a gravestone mentioning the album's title and lead single. Petras replied with a rose emoji and said, "It's ok if u wanna listen to the leaks … I'm not getting to put out any music anyways I'm f—ed. I'm devastated idk how all of this happened and I just wanna quit." In subsequent tweets, she said "Nothing is scrapped I didn't get approval to release anything. It's limbo" as well as "I hope you enjoy the songs truly. I made them for you guys so I hope you like them." Some of Petras' posts were deleted.

In November 2022, Petras said of the project: "It's what I cooked up during lockdown. All I wanted to do was to escape, so I made Problématique, which was this super Euro-pop, gay pop explosion, which I adore and love and I worked very hard on and am very proud of. But it just felt like the moment had come for me to say something different than that." She told People magazine: "I signed to Republic Records, I started working with so many amazing creative people, and I just started having new things to say, and I just took a turn, and then Problématique leaked. I just was in a moment with my music where I felt like I really wanted to switch it up and I was a little bored of making club songs, especially after Slut Pop."

References 

Kim Petras albums
Unreleased albums